Phosphatidylinositol N-acetylglucosaminyltransferase subunit Q is an enzyme that in humans is encoded by the PIGQ gene.

This gene is involved in the first step in glycosylphosphatidylinositol (GPI)-anchor biosynthesis. The GPI-anchor is a glycolipid found on many blood cells and serves to anchor proteins to the cell surface. This gene encodes a N-acetylglucosaminyl transferase component that is part of the complex that catalyzes transfer of N-acetylglucosamine (GlcNAc) from UDP-GlcNAc to phosphatidylinositol (PI).

Interactions
PIGQ has been shown to interact with PIGH, PIGA and PIGC.

References

Further reading